A Glimpse of Hell is a 2001 American-Canadian made-for-television drama film directed by Mikael Salomon. It premiered in the United States on FX on March 18, 2001. It was filmed in Halifax, Nova Scotia Canada and stars James Caan, Robert Sean Leonard, and Daniel Roebuck.

Cast

Critical reception
Buzz McClain of allmovie gave the movie 3.5 of 5 stars stating: "Taut and compelling, A Glimpse of Hell is a based-on-fact story that doesn't feel like it was drawn entirely from dry depositions and courtroom testimony."  The movie when first shown, scored a 3.3 household rating and drew 2.7 million viewers. This was enough to make A Glimpse of Hell the most-watched program in FX's seven-year history, at the time.

References

External links

2001 films
2001 drama films
2001 television films
2000s disaster films
2000s English-language films
American disaster films
American films based on actual events
English-language Canadian films
Canadian disaster films
Canadian drama films
Canadian films based on actual events
Disaster films based on actual events
Disaster television films
Drama films based on actual events
American drama television films
Films about seafaring accidents or incidents
Films about the United States Navy
Films based on non-fiction books
Films directed by Mikael Salomon
Films set in 1989
Films set on ships
Films shot in Halifax, Nova Scotia
FX Networks original films
Television films based on actual events
Television films based on books
2000s American films
2000s Canadian films